Fenton House is an historic building in the English city of York, North Yorkshire. It is a Grade II* listed structure, standing at 9 Precentor's Court.

The house dates to 1680, although a mediaeval wall was discovered when floor repairs took place. A new frontage was installed on the house around 1705, and the rear elevation was also rebuilt in the 18th century, although three original attic windows survive.  The house was largely refurbished in the 19th century, but some original panelling and the balustrade of the staircase of 1680 survive.

The building has a square plan, with four rooms on each of its two storeys.  There are also attics and a basement.  It is built of brick.

Looking directly down Precentor's Court, from its western end, to York Minster, the building was formerly the prebendal house of Cave and, later, Fenton. It stands perpendicular to 10 Precentor's Court at the western end of the street.

In 2013, the eight-bedroom home was put on the market for £1.1 million.

Viewpoint

See also
Grade II* listed buildings in the City of York

References

Precentor's Court
Houses in North Yorkshire
Buildings and structures completed in 1680
Grade II* listed buildings in York
Grade II* listed houses